Amalia Batista is a Mexican telenovela produced by Valentín Pimstein and directed by Gilberto Macin for Televisa in 1982. It is an original story by Inés Rodena and adaptation by Carlos Romero and María Antonieta Saavedra.

Susana Dosamantes, Rogelio Guerra and Roberto Ballesteros starred as protagonists, while Alicia Encinas starred as main antagonist.

Cast 

Susana Dosamantes as Amalia Batista
Rogelio Guerra as Lic. José Roberto Covarrubias
Roberto Ballesteros as Macario
Alicia Encinas as Viviana Durán
Nuria Bages as Margarita de Covarrubias
Leticia Calderón as Leticia
Leticia Perdigón as Reyna
Alicia Rodríguez as Doña Ana Mercedes
Armando Calvo as Don Daniel
Gregorio Casal as Augusto
Dolores Camarillo as Pachita
María Teresa Rivas as Doña Esperanza
Inés Morales as Irma Covarrubias
Luis Uribe as Esteban Covarrubias
Ada Carrasco as Petra
Aurora Clavel as Adela
José Elías Moreno as Jorge
Connie de la Mora as Diana
Maribella García as Marcela
Magda Karina as Iris
Rubén Rojo as Manuel
Mario Sauret as Jaimito
Beatriz Ornela as Sor María
Nubia Palacio as Eugenia
Julieta Montiel as Serafina
Alberto Gavira as Juancho
Patricia Myers as Rosa María
Marta Resnikoff as Úrsula
Jorge del Campo as Marcos
Virginia Gutiérrez as Clementina
Mónica Miguel as Matilde
Maritza Olivares as Jazmín
Antonio Brillas as Dr. Brambila
Fernando Ciangherotti as Leticia's fiance
Oscar Sánchez
Carmen Belén Richardson
Jacarandá Alfaro

Awards

References

External links

Mexican telenovelas
1983 telenovelas
1983 Mexican television series debuts
1984 Mexican television series endings
Spanish-language telenovelas
Televisa telenovelas